Makis Chavos (born 5 September 1969) is a Greek professional football manager and former player.

Chavos is best remembered for his four-and-a-half-year spell with PAOK. During the later stages of his career, he played with several clubs in the lower divisions.
As a manager, he has coached several clubs in Greece and Cyprus.

Playing career

Club
After playing as an amateur for Achilleas Triandria, Chavos transferred to Olympiacos in 1987. After making three appearances for the Reds during the first half of the 1987–88 season, he moved on loan to Apollon Kalamarias for the remainder of the season. He then transferred to A.O Trikala and enjoyed a fairly successful season, appearing in 28 games and scoring 2 goals. He then transferred to Panserraikos for the next 3 years, appearing in a total of 82 games and scoring 8 goals. This earned him a move to PAOK in 1992 where he spent the next four and a half seasons with the Thessaloniki-based club. Whilst playing for PAOK, he received his one and only cap with the Greece national team, appearing in a friendly against Cyprus on 2 September 1992.

International
His sole cap for the Greece national team came in a friendly game against Cyprus on 2 September 1992, at the Kaftanzoglio Stadium. In the second half, he came on as a substitute in place of Stratos Apostolakis.

Managerial career
Chavos started his managerial career in 2009 for Agrotikos Asteras.
His greatest success came in December 2010 with PAOK when they qualified for Round 32 of UEFA Europa League, after an away victory against Dinamo Zagreb.

References 

PAOK FC players
Olympiacos F.C. players
Trikala F.C. players
Panserraikos F.C. players
PAOK FC managers
Panetolikos F.C. managers
1969 births
Living people
Association football defenders
Greek footballers
Greece international footballers
Apollon Pontou FC players
Xanthi F.C. players
A.P.O. Akratitos Ano Liosia players
Ethnikos Asteras F.C. players
Thrasyvoulos F.C. players
Greek football managers
Greek expatriate football managers
People from Thessaloniki (regional unit)
Footballers from Central Macedonia